Caroline Catz (born Caroline Caplan; 19 October 1969)  is an English film, television and theatre actress and narrator. She is best known for her role as Louisa Glasson in Doc Martin since 2004. Her other major roles have included Detective Inspector Kate Ashurst in Murder in Suburbia, Detective Inspector Helen Morton in DCI Banks, and PC Cheryl Hutchins in The Vice.

Early life
Caroline Catz was born Caroline Caplan on 19 October 1969  in Manchester to Bernard and Rosemary Caplan.

Television and cinema 
She played opposite Michael Kitchen in a TV movie, The Guilty in June 1992. In 1994 she took a lead role in the BBC's All Quiet on the Preston Front, which ran for three series. She followed this with a spell in The Bill as Rosie Fox, during which she met Michael Higgs, who later became her husband. Her part in The Bill was the first of four long-term roles in which she played police officers; in The Vice she was a PC, in Murder in Suburbia and DCI Banks she was a Detective Inspector.

From 2004 to 2022 Catz has starred in ITV's Doc Martin, where she plays primary school headmistress Louisa Ellingham, (nee Glasson).

Catz has continued to appear in one-off roles, including In Denial of Murder, in which she played real-life murder victim Wendy Sewell, and in an episode of Hotel Babylon. She also appeared in a two-part episode of Single Handed, entitled The Stolen Child, as Dr Maggie Hunter. Originally shown in Ireland in January 2008, the episode was broadcast by ITV on 9 August 2009.

From 2012 until 2016, she played Detective Inspector Helen Morton in DCI Banks. In November 2016, ITV cancelled the programme.

In 2014, Catz directed the documentary titled A Message to the World...Whatever Happened to Jesse Hector? Also in 2014, she narrated the BBC's television documentary Ebola – The Search for a Cure.

Catz starred in the 2016 BBC One sitcom series I Want My Wife Back, playing the role of Bex.

In 2017, Catz wrote, directed, and starred in a short documentary on Delia Derbyshire, Delia Derbyshire: The Myths And The Legendary Tapes, (2017), which was screened at the BFI London Film Festival. She expanded it into a feature-length film that debuted in October 2020.

In 2018, she was the narrator on Britain's Biggest Warship, a documentary series about the aircraft carrier .

Radio 
She co-starred in Déjà Vu, a radio play broadcast by BBC Radio 4 on 4 February 2009.

Stage 
In November 2008 she played Anna, the puppet maker, in the stage production On Emotion. She has previously appeared in the West End in the Out of Joint/Royal Court Theatre production of Mark Ravenhill's Shopping and Fucking in 1997, which earned controversy for its subject matter, while Catz herself appeared topless in one scene. However, she gained notice for her performance by critics, as well as for being the only woman in the production. 

In 2012 she played Marlene in Caryl Churchill's play Top Girls directed by Max Stafford-Clark. In 2018, Catz played Susan in Curtains at the Rose Theatre in Kingston. Other theatre roles include Haunted (West End), The Recruiting Officer (Chichester Festival Theatre), Dogs Barking (Bush Theatre) and Six Degrees of Separation at the Royal Court Theatre.

Personal life 
Catz is married to actor Michael Higgs, whom she met on the set of The Bill. They have a son born in 2001 and a daughter born in 2006.

Filmography 
Television

Film

References

External links 

Living people
20th-century English actresses
21st-century English actresses
Actresses from Manchester
English stage actresses
English television actresses
1969 births